WKQQ (100.1 FM) is a radio station licensed to the city of Winchester, Kentucky.  The station is owned by iHeartMedia, who determines its programming in New York using automation, and non-local talent. It airs a rock format.

The station has been assigned these call letters by the Federal Communications Commission since February 4, 1998.

History
WKDJ began broadcasting from Winchester on October 2, 1974. It was originally owned by Clark Communications Company, a business of David Greenlee. 

WKDJ left the air in December 1980. Its country music format was replaced in late February by WFMI, owned by the Cromwell Group and featuring Top 40 music. WFMI and WHRS (1380 AM) were then sold to Premier Broadcast Corporation of Albany, New York, in 1988. Coinciding with an impending power increase from 3,000 to 50,000 watts, switched to classic rock in February 1989 and rebranded as WLFX "Fox 100".

Premier placed itself in receivership in 1991. Hancock Communications of Nashville acquired the pair the next year with plans to sell both facilities to other companies: while buyers were lined up for both stations, WLFX began simulcasting WHRS and its new soft adult contemporary format. As a result of the sale action, the 100.1 station changed hands in rapid succession, being purchased by Trumper Communications in 1993. Trumper relocated the transmitter facility to Lexington, and upon taking over, the format was changed to country as "Young Country" WWYC, competing with market leader WVLK-FM.

Trumper Communications's three-station Lexington cluster was acquired by Jacor in 1996. 

In 1998, Jacor effectuated a format swap between two of its stations. The country music format on WWYC was moved to 98.1, where it was relaunched as WBUL-FM "The Bull", while WKQQ's call sign and programming moved to 100.1 MHz.

References

External links
WKQQ official website

KQQ
Classic rock radio stations in the United States
IHeartMedia radio stations
1974 establishments in Kentucky
Radio stations established in 1974
Winchester, Kentucky